Calamus erectus, also known as viagra palm and locally as tynriew, tara, and zhi li sheng teng, is a flowering shrub in the family Arecaceae. The specific epithet (erectus) refers to the plant's habit of growing straight rather than creeping or climbing like many species of the genus Calamus.

Distribution
Calamus erectus is native to India (Arunachal Pradesh, Mizoram, Sikkim, Assam, West Bengal, Manipur, Meghalaya), Bangladesh, Bhutan, Nepal, Myanmar, Thailand, Laos, and China (Yunnan). It has been introduced to the United States. It grows wild in lower hill forests, especially on drier slopes, and grows frequently in the Tista and Rangit valley of West Bengal and Sikkim.

Description
The rachis bear up to 40 narrow leaves on each side, which are regularly arranged and slightly curved. The veins are adaxial and abaxial and the margin is bristly. The stems may be upright or leaning. Ocreas are present and have rows of short spines split into 2. Knees, flagella, and cirri are absent. The petioles and rachis have whorls of yellow to white spines. The bracts of the inflorescences are tubular and are tattering at the tip. The calyx of the flower is 3-lobed and the lobes are apiculate, and the corolla is 3-petaled. The thin skin is covered in grooved scales. It normally contains 1 large, whitish seed which is edible and bland in flavor and causes dry mouth when chewed. It germinates very quickly. The first seedling leaf is pinnate and the seedling grows at a fast rate. The plant grows well in a pot and can be grown as an ornamental in warm temperate to tropical climates. It is cold hardy to US zone 9b (25-30 F or -3 to -6 C).

Uses
The plant is cultivated experimentally in several locations across India and Bangladesh, and is cultivated in several botanical gardens, especially in the Indian Botanic Garden in Howrah. Although the canes are not useful for making furniture due to the short internodes, the Mising people of the Assam plains used strong canes of Calamus erectus along with split Dendrocalamus bamboo to make huts and used the leaves as thatch. The stems and leaves are also used by them to make poultry houses. In Bangladesh, the seeds are chewed in the place of betel nuts. It is sometimes used in folk medicine, as it is considered to hold anti-oxidant and anti-diabetic properties. It is offered to the Gods of the Sanamahism religion during the lunar new year celebration rituals known as Cheiraoba. The young shoots and leaves are eaten as a vegetable and have a bitter flavor when raw.

Nutritional value
The fruit contains rich amounts of vitamin C, vitamin A, vitamin E, calcium, magnesium, and phosphorus.

See also
List of culinary fruits
List of culinary vegetables

References

erectus
Flora of China
Flora of the Indian subcontinent
Flora of Indo-China
Taxa named by William Roxburgh
Plants described in 1832
Fruit trees
Leaf vegetables
Medicinal plants of Asia